U.S. Route 6 (US 6) in New York is a  stretch of United States Numbered Highway that spans from the Pennsylvania state line at Port Jervis to the Connecticut state line east of Brewster. Near both ends it runs in close proximity to Interstate 84 (I-84), which otherwise takes a more northerly route through Downstate New York. US 6, meanwhile, skirts the northern fringe of the New York metropolitan area.

Except for a section concurrent with the expressway portion of New York State Route 17 (NY 17; the future I-86) and another brief, similar stretch in Peekskill, US 6 is a two-lane road in New York. Two stretches are shared with US 202. It goes through three of New York's traffic circles, more than any other highway in the state, and is part of the only concurrency of three U.S. routes in the state.

US 6 is not as important a transportation artery in New York as it in some other states. The route does, however, pass through some of the region's more memorable scenery, particularly the Hudson Highlands in the form of Harriman and Bear Mountain state parks. It crosses the Hudson River at the historic Bear Mountain Bridge. Other highlights include the Shawangunk Ridge in the west and New York City's reservoirs in the east.

Route description

The Hudson River roughly bisects New York's section of US 6, although more of it is on the river's western side. Despite its many curves and turns, the road stays in a generally east–west direction.

West of Harriman
US 6 crosses the Delaware River into New York concurrent with US 209 from Matamoras via the Mid-Delaware Bridge. Upon entering Port Jervis, they become Pike Street. Two blocks from the bridge, the highways cross under the wide grassy strip that once carried the Erie Railroad's Main Line and pass the city's Metro-North station, the most remote from New York on the extensive commuter rail network. A few blocks further north, at the Park Avenue traffic light, NY 42 and NY 97 begin to the left while US 6 and US 209 turn right, now West Main Street.

Two blocks later, the highways having not even come a mile from the state line, US 209 splits to the left at Kingston Avenue. US 6 continues to follow West Main past Port Jervis Middle School and Bon Secours Hospital, veering south to cross under the railroad tracks and then over the Neversink River. At a three-way junction with short County Route 15 (CR 15), US 6 reaches the Port Jervis city limit. Signs point to Route 23, which begins a few hundred feet to the south, just past the I-84 overpass.

From here traffic on US 6 grows lighter as it parallels I-84 for the next . It slowly traverses up the Shawangunk Ridge alongside the Interstate Highway and then down again. Just before exit 3, it crosses under I-84 again. After putting at least  between the two, US 6 starts to run a long straight course, as Grand Army of the Republic Highway, through the wetlands of Greenville, then through gently rolling hills taking it to South Centreville, where Minisink Valley High School and the district's other schools are concentrated. At the hamlet of Slate Hill, NY 284, another route down to New Jersey, comes in from the south.

US 6 continues through very rural countryside through here. Shortly before Middletown, it crosses over I-84 and turns right onto NY 17M, crossing over the Interstate Highway yet again. This is US 6's last crossing of I-84 west of the Hudson River.

The overlap between US 6 and NY 17M continues for another , crossing the Wallkill River, through slightly more developed countryside to Goshen, where the two routes join the NY 17 freeway (future I-86) at exit 123. It breaks from the freeway outside of Harriman by way of a long overpass that leaves just before the Quickway ends at the junction with the north–south portion of NY 17, NY 32, and the New York State Thruway, an area often jammed with traffic from nearby Woodbury Common Premium Outlets on busy weekends. Another portion of traffic is bound for the U.S. Military Academy at West Point, per the signs on the thruway directing drivers to use eastbound US 6 for that purpose.

Long Mountain and Palisades Interstate parkways

With the thruway behind, US 6 climbs the side of a mountain, just as it does after Port Jervis. A small pullout area reveals views of the mall and the area around the exit. At the top lies Harriman State Park, where US 6 becomes Long Mountain Parkway, a  stretch with no development. NY 293 leaves to the north to West Point's upper gates and the road widens briefly to include a middle turn lane. After dropping past a lake and then rising again, the long-distance Long Path hiking trail crosses the road on its way to the feature that gives this section of the highway its name. Driveways to the south lead to private camps that have housed various area hiking clubs since the 1920s.

A long descent leads to Long Mountain Circle, where Seven Lakes Drive crosses and US 6 joins the Palisades Interstate Parkway, descending slowly through a very scenic  through Bear Mountain State Park between Bear Mountain to the south and Popolopen Torne to the north into another roundabout, the busy Bear Mountain Circle, where the parkway ends and US 6 intersects US 9W and US 202. The latter joins US 6 to cross the Hudson River via the Bear Mountain Bridge. The rocky slopes of Anthony's Nose loom ahead. A $1.50 toll is charged in this direction. The white blazes of the Appalachian Trail (AT) are also visible on the lamppost.

East of the Hudson River
At the east end of the bridge, the AT turns north along NY 9D, which begins here. US 6 and US 202 turn right and begin a  descent via Bear Mountain Bridge Road along the edge of the mountain to Peekskill. Pulloffs along this winding stretch allow drivers to take in sweeping views of that city, Haverstraw Bay, and Dunderberg Mountain across the river at the southern end of the Hudson Highlands. The road finally reaches US 6's third traffic circle just north of the city limit. Here US 9 joins the two highways for an  concurrency, the only combination of three U.S. Routes in the state. At a traffic light south of the circle, the Bear Mountain State Parkway goes off to the east while the concurrency becomes the upper end of the Croton Expressway.

US 6 and US 202 separate from US 9 at the first interchange and pick up NY 35, which begins here.

Northeast of Peekskill, US 6 works its way north, through the hamlet of Mohegan Lake and Shrub Oak, where it meets the Taconic State Parkway by way of an interchange. It continues east, just south of the county line, into Jefferson Valley and past Oceola Lake, where NY 6N, the lone spur of US 6 in New York, begins a northerly loop. At Baldwin Place, it veers north again and enters Putnam County.

Just past the county line, NY 118 comes to its northern end. US 6 runs ever more northerly, meeting NY 6N's other end as it follows the south shore of Lake Mahopac through the village of Mahopac.

The combined influence of the New York City water supply system's Croton Watershed, which includes most of the bodies of water along this stretch of US 6, and affluent residents who build on very large lots, keeps this area lightly developed. Leaving Mahopac, US 6 curves past the south end of West Branch Reservoir and controlled Lake Gleneida to its next highway junction, the east end of NY 52 at Reed Memorial Library just south of the county seat, Carmel. The highway immediately turns toward the south again, curving around Middle Branch Reservoir at Tilly Foster to the west terminus of NY 312. At this junction, signs for Southeast station on the Harlem Line of the Metro-North Railroad are a reminder that this is still commuter country. Also appearing are the first signs for I-84, whose interchange with NY 312 is a short distance away, since Middletown.

A long bend through countryside increasingly anticipating New England brings US 6 over the Metro-North Railroad tracks and to a right turn along them takes US 6 into Brewster. At that village's Metro-North station, the highway again turns left, bringing it to an intersection just outside the village where it is reunited with US 202, here concurrent with NY 22. After crossing under the interstate, the road encounters a half-cloverleaf interchange. NY 22 turns left and leaves for Pawling and points north. I-684 is a short distance to the south, accessed by way of NY 981B, a short reference route occupying the I-684 right-of-way between I-84 and NY 22. US 6 and US 202 remain parallel with I-84, following the southern shore of one of the lakes of East Branch Reservoir. After one last highway terminus, NY 121's northern end, both cross into Danbury, Connecticut, right next to the Interstate Highway's Mill Plain Road exit.

History

Origins and designation

The portion of US 6 in New York east of Fort Montgomery was originally designated as part of NY 37 in the mid-1920s. NY 37 began at NY 17 (now NY 17M) in Monroe and followed what is now CR 105 and NY 32 east to Central Valley. From there, it continued to Fort Montgomery via Estrada Road and modern NY 293, NY 218, and US 9W. When the U.S. Numbered Highway System was created on November 11, 1926, there was a gap in US 6 between the New York–Pennsylvania border at Port Jervis and the Connecticut state line east of Brewster. The gap remained in the first official route log published by the American Association of State Highway Officials (AASHO) in 1927; however, US 6 now entered New York at Port Jervis and followed what is now US 209 northeast to Kingston, where the west half of US 6 ended at US 9W. The eastern half of US 6 still began at the Connecticut state line east of Brewster. In 1928, AASHO modified the definition of US 6, placing the route along a new alignment further south in the state in order to eliminate the gap in the designation. It now followed a previously unnumbered highway from Port Jervis to Slate Hill and overlapped with the preexisting NY 8 from Slate Hill to Middletown and NY 17 (modern NY 17M) between Middletown and Monroe. From Monroe to Brewster, US 6 replaced NY 37. The former routing of US 6 between Port Jervis and Kingston became US 6N. US 6 was realigned again  to bypass the U.S. Military Academy to the south. Its former alignment through the grounds became NY 293.

Realignments

US 6 originally followed a more northerly alignment between Shrub Oak and Mahopac that took the route through Mahopac Falls. In the mid-1930s, US 6 was realigned to follow a new highway to the south that went directly between the two locations. The route's former alignment via Mahopac Falls was redesignated as NY 6N . In the early 1950s, construction began on the portion of the Quickway east of Goshen. The Goshen–Chester and Chester–Harriman segments of the Quickway were completed in October 1954 and August 1955, respectively. The two segments of highway became part of a realigned US 6 and NY 17 upon opening. The original surface alignment of US 6 became part of NY 17M. Plans to construct a highway directly linking Harriman to the south end of NY 293 in Harriman State Park were proposed as early as 1954; however, construction on the road did not begin until the mid-1960s. The highway opened to traffic by 1968 as part of a rerouted US 6.

In the town of Yorktown, US 6 was originally routed along East Main Street in the areas around the hamlets of Shrub Oak and Jefferson Valley. At some point between 1968 and 1973, the portion of US 6 between the Taconic State Parkway and Curry Street was moved onto a new two-lane roadway bypassing Jefferson Valley to the south. The segment between Strawberry Road and the parkway was moved onto a new highway bypassing Shrub Oak to the north sometime in the late 1970s or early 1980s. The old alignment of US 6 west of NY 6N is now a town-maintained road designated as CR 1309 by Westchester County for planning purposes. The segment east of NY 6N became an extension of that route and was realigned slightly to meet US 6 at a 90-degree angle. In 1993, the interchange with the Taconic State Parkway and NY 132 was reconstructed and US 6 was widened to two lanes in each direction through the interchange.

Future
The New York State Department of Transportation started a year-long construction project in October 2019 in Brewster to rebuild the US 6 bridge over Metro-North Railroad's Harlem Line and to build a direct intersection with Michael Neuner Drive.

Major intersections

Related routes
There are two special routes of US 6 in the state of New York, US 6 Alternate (US 6 Alt.) in Cortlandt and US 6 Truck in Woodbury–Highlands.

NY 6N

New York State Route 6N (NY 6N) is a  alternate route of US 6 through the towns of Yorktown, Westchester County, and Carmel, Putnam County. The spur leaves US 6 in the hamlet of Jefferson Valley and rejoins it in the hamlet of Mahopac. NY 6N follows a more northerly route than US 6 in order to serve Mahopac Falls. The designation was assigned , after a previous US 6N in New York between Port Jervis and Kingston had been renamed US 209.

See also

References

External links

 New York
06
Limited-access roads in New York (state)
Harriman State Park (New York)
Transportation in Orange County, New York
Transportation in Westchester County, New York
Transportation in Putnam County, New York
Transportation in Rockland County, New York